The Biblioteca Popular "Rafael de Aguiar is a public library created in 1947 by Juana Couretot de Guella and officially inaugurated in 1948 in honor of the founder of San Nicolás de los Arroyos. Its main mission is to provide the beneficts of reading habits, information and support to the educative work in its different levels. 

Through the time, this institution has developed different activities and started a large number of projects, transforming into one of the most important libraries of the city.

External links
 Biblioteca Popular "Rafael de Aguiar"

Libraries in Argentina
Buildings and structures in Buenos Aires Province
Education in Buenos Aires Province
Library buildings completed in 1948
Libraries established in 1948
1948 establishments in Argentina